Major League Baseball 2K9 Fantasy All-Stars is a Nintendo DS spin-off of Major League Baseball 2K9 in the vein of MLB Power Pros, developed by Canadian studio Deep Fried Entertainment and published by 2K Sports. The game was released on March 3, 2009.

Gameplay

According to the ESRB listing:

The game retains similar gameplay to its predecessor.

Cover athlete

Like MLB 2K9, Tim Lincecum of the San Francisco Giants is the cover athlete, albeit in cartoon form.

Development

Reception 

IGN gave Major League Baseball 2K9 Fantasy All-Stars a 6.2 out of 10, deeming it a significant step up from its predecessor and citing the improvements made to pitching and touch controls as positives. IGN also criticized the stadium gimmicks, pacing, and the lack of an in-depth season or franchise mode.

See also
Major League Baseball 2K8 Fantasy All-Stars
Major League Baseball 2K9
MLB Power Pros
MLB Stickball
2K Sports Major League Baseball series

References

2009 video games
2K Sports games
Fantasy sports video games
Major League Baseball video games
Nintendo DS games
Nintendo DS-only games
North America-exclusive video games
Multiplayer and single-player video games
Take-Two Interactive games
Video games developed in Canada
Deep Fried Entertainment games